Nassarius pauperatus, commonly known as the impoverished dog whelk, is a species of sea snail, a marine gastropod mollusk in the family Nassariidae, the nassa mud snails, or dog whelks.

Description
The length of the shell varies from 12 mm to 20 mm.

The ovate, conical shell is pointed at the summit. The pyramidal spire is formed of six or seven distinct, smooth, convex whorls. These are covered with very prominent, convex, longitudinal folds, intersected only at the base, and upon the two or three upper whorls, by a few pretty deep transverse striae. Upon these whorls, the striae become finer and more approximate. They rarely exist upon the whole surface. In like manner, the longitudinal folds do not appear upon the right portion of the body whorl. The color is a violaceous white. A dark red zone borders the suture, and a broader and browner band surrounds the middle of the body whorl.

Distribution
This marine species is endemic to Australia and occurs off of New South Wales, South Australia, Tasmania, Victoria, and Western Australia.

References

 Lamarck, J.B.P.A. de M. 1822. Histoire naturelle des Animaux sans Vertèbres. Paris : J.B. Lamarck Vol. 7 711 pp.
 Menke, C.T. 1843. Molluscorum Novae Hollandiae Specimen in Libraria Aulica Hahniana. Hannoverae : Libraria Aulica Hahniana pp. 1–46
 Cernohorsky, W.O. 1981. Revision of the Australian and New Zealand Tertiary and Recent species of the family Nassariidae (Mollusca: Gastropoda. Records of the Auckland Institute and Museum 18: 137–192 
 Cernohorsky W. O. (1984). Systematics of the family Nassariidae (Mollusca: Gastropoda). Bulletin of the Auckland Institute and Museum 14: 1–356
 Wilson, B. 1994. Australian Marine Shells. Prosobranch Gastropods. Kallaroo, WA : Odyssey Publishing Vol. 2 370 pp.

External links
  Reeve, L.A. 1853. Monograph of the genus Nassa. pls 1–25 in Reeve, L.A. (ed). Conchologia Iconica. London : L. Reeve Vol. 8
 

Nassariidae
Gastropods described in 1822
Gastropods of Australia